Charles “Max” Fernandez (born ) is a Labour Party politician from Antigua and Barbuda who was the Minister of Foreign Affairs and International Trade from June 2014 to 2018. He currently serves as Minister of Tourism, Investment and Economic Development.

Early life and education

Charles “Max” Henry Fernandez grew up in St. John’s, and attended St. Joseph’s Academy. He completed a Business Management Degree at the University of the West Indies.

Career

He joined the Labour Party in 1984, and in 1995 Prime Minister Lester Bird appointed him to the Senate, where he served until 2004. During his time in the Senate, he was also the Chairman of the Board of The Free Trade and the Chairman of the Board of The Medical Benefits Scheme.

Fernandez was elected to the House of Representatives in the 2009 Elections for the St. John’s Rural North Constituency, where he presently resides with his wife Jill and three sons.

He was the Minister of Foreign Affairs and International Trade from June 2014 to 2018.

See also
List of foreign ministers in 2017

References

External links

 

Living people
1954 births
Antigua and Barbuda people of Spanish descent
Foreign ministers of Antigua and Barbuda
Antigua and Barbuda Labour Party politicians
Members of the Senate (Antigua and Barbuda)
Members of the House of Representatives (Antigua and Barbuda)
Government ministers of Antigua and Barbuda
University of the West Indies alumni
People from St. John's, Antigua and Barbuda